Nakatsukasa (中務, 912–991) was a Japanese Waka poet from the middle Heian period. 

Nakatsukasa was the granddaughter of Emperor Uda and the daughter of poet Lady Ise and Prince Atsuyoshi. She is one of five women numbered as one of the Thirty-six Poetry Immortals. (She married another of the famous thirty-six, Minamoto no Saneakira (源信明).

Many of her poems are included in the Japanese imperial poetry anthology Gosen Wakashū (後撰和歌集), issued in 951.

External links
 Nakatsukasa's poetry online in Japanese

References 

912 births
991 deaths
Women of medieval Japan
10th-century Japanese women writers
10th-century writers
Japanese women poets
10th-century Japanese poets
10th-century Japanese people